Iconoclast is the second studio album by Australian black metal band Nazxul. The album, released through Moribund Records, was the band's first studio release in more than a decade, as their Black Seed EP was released in 1998.

Track listing 
  Apoptosis
  Dragon Dispitous
  III
  Black Wings
  V
  Iconoclast
  I
  Set in Array
  II
  Symbol of Night & Winter (Ancient Lords)
  Oath (Fides Resurrectio)
  Stain of Harrow
  World Oblivion
  Threnody

Lineup  
 Adrian Henderson - Bass, Keyboards
Lachlan Mitchell - Keyboards
Greg Morelli - Guitar
Tim Yatras - Drums, Keyboards
Mitchell Keepin - Guitar
Luke Mills - Vocals

References 

2009 albums
Nazxul albums